Willi Meier (13 April 1907 – 19 March 1979) was a German athlete. He competed in the men's long jump at the 1928 Summer Olympics.

References

1907 births
1979 deaths
Athletes (track and field) at the 1928 Summer Olympics
German male long jumpers
Olympic athletes of Germany
Place of birth missing